Extended Circle is an album by pianist Tord Gustavsen's Quartet released on the ECM label.

Reception

The Allmusic review by Thom Jurek awarded the album 4 stars and stated "On Extended Circle, the pianist's roots remain contemplative, but the maturity of the communication among these players provides a more fluid and physical sense of motion, revealing a multi-faceted approach to both playing his tunes and improvising".

Writing in The Guardian, John Fordham called it "a delicious collage of hypnotic grooving, softly stroked gospel themes, and perhaps more gloves-off jazz piano from the leader than on all five of his previous ECM albums".

The All About Jazz review by John Kelman said that "the evolution Expanded Circle demonstrates is equally the inevitable consequence of regular recording and touring with this group of hyper-talented musicians".

Track listing
All compositions by Tord Gustavsen except as indicated

Personnel
Tord Gustavsen - piano
Tore Brunborg - tenor saxophone
Mats Eilertsen - bass
Jarle Vespestad - drums

References

ECM Records albums
Tord Gustavsen albums
2014 albums
Albums produced by Manfred Eicher